Virginia "Ginny" Baxter (December 3, 1932 – December 18, 2014) was an American figure skater from Detroit. She was born in Detroit, Michigan. She won the bronze medal at the United States Figure Skating Championships three times and captured the bronze at the 1952 World Figure Skating Championships (competition held March 1).  Perhaps the high point of her career was the 1952 Winter Olympics, where she won the free skating portion of the event, placing 5th overall after an 8th place in the compulsory figures.

After her competitive career, she was part of Ice Capades' 1953 show called Land of Lollipops. She died on December 18, 2014.

Results

References

1932 births
2014 deaths
American female single skaters
Olympic figure skaters of the United States
Figure skaters at the 1952 Winter Olympics
World Figure Skating Championships medalists
Figure skaters from Detroit
21st-century American women
20th-century American women